is a Japanese international school in Si Racha, Chonburi, Thailand. It is affiliated with the Thai-Japanese Association School in Bangkok. The school began its operations in early 2009 with an enrollment of 89 students. Currently the School has approximately 456 students.

References

Further reading
Japanese:
 今井 茂人. "姉妹校シラチャ日本人学校、4月開校." バンコク日本人商工会議所所報 (570), 21-26, 2009-10. 盤谷日本人商工会議所. CiNii ID 40016865965.
 "2009年4月、待望のシラチャ日本人学校が開校します--バンコク日本人学校の姉妹校として、泰日協会学校理事会が一体経営します." バンコク日本人商工会議所所報 (554), 17-22, 2008-06. 盤谷日本人商工会議所. CiNii ID 40016092853.

External links
 Thai Japanese Association School 
 

Buildings and structures in Chonburi province
Japanese international schools in Thailand
Sriracha
Educational institutions established in 2009
2009 establishments in Thailand